Dănciulești is a commune in Gorj County, Oltenia, Romania. It is composed of seven villages: Bibulești, Dănciulești, Hălăngești, Obârșia, Petrăchei, Rădinești and Zăicoiu.

References

Communes in Gorj County
Localities in Oltenia